Roberto Ascione (Naples, Italy, August 9, 1973 – ) is an Italian entrepreneur and global thought leader in the field of digital health. He was founder of Healthware International, and on September 28, 2016, he was named as the Top Global Industry Leader by Health 2.0 organization.

Biography

Roberto Ascione is the first-born son of Antonio, a prominent Italian hepatologist and descendant, from his mother's side, of Raffaele Viviani; and Paola Scialoja, a Communication Sciences professor at Suor Orsola Benincasa University of Naples.

He tried the university studies at University of Naples Federico II, where he studied Biological Sciences and Medicine between 1992-1999. While a medical student, he became progressively engaged with the connections between digital technology, medicine and communication sciences, and started to think about way to impact healthcare more largely as an individual physician. In 1997, he founded in Naples the first Healthware company, whose name derived from the merging of the words "Health(care)" and "(soft)ware". This startup company provided consulting services in the newborn field of health tech, and became progressively active in the field of digitalization of health records.

Building on the success of the first years, the company expanded to the pharmaceutical marketing services industry, achieving both international expansion and a progressively stronger reputation in the field. In order to sustain Healthware growth, in 2001 Ascione moved his company from Naples to Salerno, in near proximity with the local university faculties of Informatics and Communication Sciences.

Following about ten years of economic and capabilities growth at international level, in 2007 Healthware was acquired by the advertising giant Publicis Groupe, while Ascione retained the control of operations as President. The new company, rebranded as Publicis Healthware International, rapidly became an integrator for other companies of the Publicis Healthcare Communications Group. He finally integrated Razorfish Health, the healthcare branch of Razorfish, always maintaining his position as Global President and CEO. The resulting company was branded Razorfish Healthware, with bases in the United States, Europe and Far East, with two global hubs in Salerno and New York City.

In 2015, Ascione led the demerging of the original company from Publicis Groupe, and rebranded the resulting entity as Healthware International. During the same year, he launched Healthware Labs in New York City, a company subset devoted to startup incubation and development in the field of digital health, which was labeled as one of the most innovative divisions of 2015.

In addition to his duties with Healthware International, Ascione is a board member of research and education organizations in the field of oncological research (Oncotech), post-genomics and bioinformatics (Biogene) and biotechnology (Bio Ricerche 2010).

Thought leadership

Further to his entrepreneurial activity, Roberto Ascione is a globally acknowledged thought leader in the field of Digital Health.

He is often invited as a guest speaker at top international conferences of his field of activity, as Lions Health, Health 2.0, Doctors 2.0 & You, Health Tech Summit, Healthcare Businesswomen Association Summit, Frontiers of Interaction.

He is particularly devoted to foster startup development in the field of digital health, and holds an advisory position in Luiss EnLabs, the startup factory of LUISS University (Rome), Digital Magics HealthTech (Milan), Seedcamp (London), Start-up Bootcamp (Berlin) and Junto Health (New York).

Notes

External links
Personal website
Healthware Group website
Healthware Labs website

Italian chief executives
Living people
1973 births
Businesspeople in the health care industry
Businesspeople from Naples